Zachary Scott Robinson (born 11 June 2002) is an English professional footballer who plays as a striker for Scottish Championship club Dundee, on loan from AFC Wimbledon.

Career

AFC Wimbledon
On 9 September 2019, whilst still a second year scholar at AFC Wimbledon, Robinson joined Basingstoke Town on loan. On 13 November 2019, Robinson made his debut for the club in a 3–1 EFL Trophy loss against Southend United. He scored his first goal for Wimbledon in an EFL Trophy tie against Brighton & Hove Albion U21s on 22 September 2020. He made his league debut on 26 December 2020 in a 2–0 defeat to Oxford United, coming off of the bench to replace Ethan Chislett in the 87th minute of the match.

On 12 April 2021, Robinson joined National League side Woking on loan until the end of the season, making his debut the following day as he played the entirety of an incredible 4–3 defeat at home to Bromley.

In August 2021, Robinson joined National League South side, Hemel Hempstead Town on a one-month loan and went onto net on his debut during a 4–2 defeat to Maidstone United, giving the Tudors an early lead in the 36th minute.

On 8 January 2022, Robinson joined National League South side Hampton & Richmond Borough on a one-month loan deal. He went onto feature ten times, scoring three goals before being recalled by Wimbledon in March 2022.

Loans to Dundee 
On 30 July 2022, after signing a two-year contract extension with Wimbledon, Robinson joined Scottish Championship club Dundee on a season-long loan. He made his debut for Dundee on the same day against Partick Thistle. On 12 August, Robinson scored his first goal for Dundee, in a home win over Arbroath. After a very successful first half of the season with Dundee, scoring 8 goals in 19 appearances, Robinson was recalled early by Wimbledon in January 2023.

On 31 January 2023, Robinson returned on loan to Dundee until the end of the season. He marked his league return with the Dark Blues by scoring the opening goal in a 3–0 victory over Cove Rangers.

Career statistics

References

2002 births
Living people
Association football forwards
English footballers
AFC Wimbledon players
Basingstoke Town F.C. players
Leatherhead F.C. players
Woking F.C. players
Hemel Hempstead Town F.C. players
Hampton & Richmond Borough F.C. players
Dundee F.C. players
Southern Football League players
Isthmian League players
National League (English football) players
English Football League players
Scottish Professional Football League players
Black British sportspeople